Gerald "Lord" Rhaburn is a Belizean calypso, soca, reggae and brukdown musician. He became famous when performing with the Lord Rhaburn Combo in the 1970s and 1980s.

Rhaburn has toured frequently abroad promoting Belizean music.

In 2004 he hosted the first Lord Rhaburn Music Awards, an annual Belizean music awards show.

References

Belizean musicians
Living people
Belizean composers
Male composers
Bandleaders
Soca musicians
Calypsonians
Year of birth missing (living people)

Daughter Beverly Trapp - 08/04/1957 still living